Passiflora xishuangbannaensis is a passion flower vine in the genus Passiflora that is endemic to Yunnan, China. It was described in 2005 by Shawn E. Krosnick.

References
 
 

xishuangbannaensis
Plants described in 2005
Endemic flora of Yunnan